Fred Scarlett MBE (born 29 April 1975 in Ashford) is an English Olympic gold medalist as a British rower.

He took up rowing at The King's School Canterbury, and was Captain of Boats in his final year. At Oxford Brookes University, he won two Henley Royal Regatta medals, in the Temple Challenge Cup, and the Visitors Challenge Cup. He had success at the junior and under-23 levels, and at the 1998 World University Championships, he won gold in the coxless pairs. Fred then became part of the British eight with coxswain, winning a silver medal at the 1999 World Rowing Championships, and then a gold medal in the 2000 Summer Olympics in Sydney. He retired shortly after. He was appointed Member of the Order of the British Empire in the 2001 New Year Honours list.

He now lives in Paris, working for Krug Champagne.

References

External links

1975 births
English male rowers
English Olympic medallists
Olympic rowers of Great Britain
Olympic gold medallists for Great Britain
Living people
Olympic medalists in rowing
Medalists at the 2000 Summer Olympics
World Rowing Championships medalists for Great Britain
Rowers at the 2000 Summer Olympics